Baren is the local season of the reality The Bar in Denmark. The show was aired in 2001 and 2002 with 2 seasons in total. TV3 is the channel was aired.

Season 1
Start Date: 22 January 2001.
End Date: 30 April 2001.
Duration: 99 days.
Contestants:
The Finalists: Erkan (The Winner) & Maria (Runner-up).
Evicted Contestants: Betina, Christian*, Henrik, Jan, Jeanette, Marie, Martin, Michael, Mona, Nikolaj, Richard, Rikke & Tonja.
Voluntary Exits: Christian* voluntarily exited the show and re-entered shortly afterwards.

Contestants

Nominations

Season 2
Name: Baren 2002
Start Date: 17 January 2002
End Date: 11 April 2002
Duration: 85 days
Contestants:
The Finalists: Noel (The Winner), Thomas H (Runner-up), Carsten & Jeanett
Evicted Contestants: Anja, Bernhard, Carina, Christian, Heidi, Henrik, Maria, Phuong, Rene, Rikke, Tenna & Thomas B.

Contestants

Nominations
This season the nomination rules changed. There were no plus/minus voting. Instead each contestant had to nominate 1 other contestant for eviction.

The contestant with the most nominations would face the public vote alone. The public then voted on if the contestant should be evicted or not.

If the vote was to evict then the contestant was evicted. If the vote was to stay then the contestant would choose the contestant to be evicted.

References

2000s Danish television series
2001 Danish television series debuts
2002 Danish television series endings
Danish reality television series
Danish-language television shows
TV3 (Denmark) original programming